Excoecaria is a plant genus of the family Euphorbiaceae, formally described by Linnaeus in 1759. The genus is native to the Old World Tropics (Africa, southern Asia, northern Australia, and assorted oceanic islands).

Etymology
Genus name, Excoecaria, is from the Latin word excaeco, which means "to blind" and refers to the sap of the plants that can cause temporary blindness.

Toxic latex
The milky latex of Excoecaria agallocha, also known as Thillai, milky mangrove, blind-your-eye mangrove and river poison tree, is poisonous.  Mangroves of this plant surround the ancient Thillai Chidambaram Temple in Tamil Nadu. Contact with skin can cause irritation and rapid blistering; contact with eyes will result in temporary blindness.  It is distributed in the Pichavaram wetlands, near Chidambaram India, in Australia from northern New South Wales, along the northern coastline around to Western Australia.The latex is extremely poisonous. Even dried and powdered leaves contain the poison which can kill fish very quickly.

Species list
The list of currently recognized species in this genus.

Former species
These species were once included in Excoecaria but are not now consider members of this genus. They have been moved to these other genera: Actinostemon, Adenopeltis, Alchornea, Anomostachys, Bocquillonia, Bonania, Cerbera, Falconeria, Grimmeodendron, Gymnanthes, Homalanthus, Maprounea, Microstachys, Neoshirakia, Sapium, Sclerocroton, Sebastiania, Shirakiopsis, Spirostachys, Stillingia, and Triadica.

References

External links
 milky mangrove

 
Euphorbiaceae genera